Garra hughi (cardamon garra) is an endangered species of ray-finned fish in the genus Garra. It occurs in high mountain streams of the Southern Western Ghats, from the Anamalai Hills, south to the Agasthyamala Hills. The species is a benthopelagic fish, found in mountain streams.

The juveniles are free swimmers and are found in more cleaner waters closer to the banks and in pools and puddles along the course of the stream. The juveniles have an omnivorous diet including earthworms, aquatic insects, mostly larvae of chironomids and ephemeropterans and bits of filamentous algae and detritus, which is different from that of the adult. The adult fish takes to feeding on vegetable matter (mainly algae) with a change in its mode of living, to life close to the substratum of the rapid waters of the streams. A lot of the habitat of G. hughi is threatened primarily by habitat degradation.

References

Garra
Taxa named by Eric Godwin Silas
Fish described in 1955